Richard A. Fineberg is an independent investigative journalist in Alaska specializing in issues related to petroleum development. As a PhD student at Claremont Graduate School in 1968, he conducted research on the Delano grape strike, ascertaining that grape growers were substituting immigrant and other impoverished labourers for workers who had joined the strike. In 1971, shortly before leaving his post as a political science professor at the University of Alaska, he joined the Phyllis Cormack expedition by Greenpeace to protest nuclear weapons testing on Amchitka Island. He later said that he viewed testing so close to the border of the Soviet Union as an act of aggression. Subsequently, he became a senior advisor to the Governor of Alaska on oil and gas policy, and consulted for government agencies at the state and federal level.

References

External links
Fineberg Research

Year of birth missing (living people)
Living people
People from Fairbanks North Star Borough, Alaska
American male journalists